Honey Bottom (also written as Honeybottom) is a hamlet in the civil parish of Shaw-cum-Donnington in the English county of Berkshire.

It covers the very north-eastern portion of the Donnington half of the parish of Shaw-cum-Donnington, on the southern edge of Snelsmore Common.

References

Hamlets in Berkshire
West Berkshire District